Dany Mota Carvalho (born 2 May 1998) is a Portuguese professional footballer who plays as a forward for  club Monza.

Starting his senior career in Luxembourg at CS Pétange, Mota moved to Italy in 2014 to Serie B club Virtus Entella. He spent four seasons at the club, having his breakthrough season in the 2018–19 Serie C where he scored 13 league goals. The following season Mota moved to Juventus U23, where he spent the first half of the season, before moving to Monza for the second half, helping them gain promotion to the Serie B.

Born in Luxembourg to Portuguese parents, Mota holds dual-citizenship. He has represented the Portugal national under-21 team at the 2021 UEFA European Under-21 Championship, helping them finish runners-up.

Early life 
Born on 2 May 1998 in Niederkorn, Luxembourg to Portuguese immigrants, Mota holds both Luxembourgish and Portuguese citizenship.

Club career

Virtus Entella 
On 17 September 2015, Serie B side Virtus Entella signed Mota. He made his professional debut on 14 May 2016, in a 2015–16 Serie B match against Avellino. Mota ended the season with two appearances. On 17 April 2017, Mota scored his first senior goal for Virtus Entella, in a 1–1 draw against Ternana. He scored one goal in six appearances during the 2016–17 season. The following season, Mota made three appearances in the league, and one in the Coppa Italia, without scoring.

Mota's breakthrough season for Virtus Entella came in the 2018–19 Serie C. After scoring his first Coppa Italia goal against Salernitana on 12 August 2018, Mota scored a brace the following game in the league against Gozzano, his first in his professional career, before scoring once again the next matchday against Pisa. Mota scored his second brace for Virtus Entella on 20 February 2019, against Pistoiese in the league in a 3–1 home win. The player ended the season with 13 goals in 35 appearances in the league, as well as one goal in four Coppa Italia appearances.

Juventus U23 
On 5 August 2019, Mota joined Juventus on a permanent transfer from Virtus Entella. The Serie A champions moved him to their reserve team playing in Serie C: Juventus U23.

Mota made his debut for Juventus U23 on 26 August 2019, in a 2–0 home win over Novara in the league. The following matchday, on 1 September 2019, Mota scored a brace against Siena; his team, however, lost the encounter 2–3. He scored four consecutive league goals, between 18 and 30 September 2019, against Arezzo, Pontedera, AlbinoLeffe, and Monza, his eventual future club. Mota scored seven league goals in 20 appearances in the first half of the 2019–20 season.

Monza

2019–20 season 
On 20 January 2020, Monza signed Mota on a six-month loan from Juventus, with obligation to buy in case Monza were promoted to the Serie B. He made his debut for his new team on 22 January 2019, coming on as a substitute on the 60th minute in a league match against Pro Patria. Mota scored his first goal for Monza 23 minutes later from a header, helping his team win 2–0. He scored two goals in six games, before the season was cut short due to COVID-19 precautions; Monza were crowned champions of Serie C, and were promoted to the Serie B for the first time in 19 years.

2020–21 season 
Mota's first Serie B game for Monza during the 2020–21 season was in the season opener on 25 September 2020, drawing 0–0 to newly-relegated SPAL. His first goal of the season came on 7 November, helping Monza win 2–0 against Frosinone in the league. On 17 April 2021, Mota scored and made an assist in a 2–1 home win against Cremonese. He finished the season with six goals and five assists.

2021–22 season 
On 18 September 2021, Mota scored his first goal of the 2021–22 season: a 30-meter shot in the 5th minute against Ternana; the match ended in a 1–1 draw. He scored braces in consecutive home games – a 3–2 win against Como and a 4–1 win against Cosenza – equalling his previous season's league goal tally of six goals on 30 November. Mota was key in helping Monza gain promotion to the Serie A for the first time, scoring 12 goals and making 5 assists in 32 games throughout the season.

2022–23 season 
Mota made his Serie A debut on 13 August 2022, as a substitute at home against Torino; he scored Monza's first-ever Serie A goal in stoppage time, with the match ending in a 2–1 defeat.

International career 
On 5 September 2019, Mota made his youth international debut for Portugal U21, scoring a brace against Gibraltar in a 4–0 win at the 2021 UEFA European Under-21 Championship qualification. He scored four goals in the qualifiers, helping Portugal reach the final tournament. In the group stage, Mota scored a goal against England to help Portugal qualify to the knock-out stage. His brace, including a bicycle kick which was nominated Goal of the Tournament, against Italy in the quarter-finals enabled Portugal to win 5–3 after extra time and qualify to the semi-finals against Spain. Portugal finished the tournament as runners-up, losing the final 1–0 to Germany.

Style of play 
A versatile and dynamic forward, Mota can play in a multitude of offensive positions, mainly as a second striker or winger. His main characteristics are his dribbling and ball control in narrow situations, alongside his pace and physical strength. Mota's attitude on the pitch, stamina, attacking positioning in the box and finishing are also of note.

Personal life 
Mota speaks five languages: Portuguese, Italian, German, French, and Luxembourgish. His idol is compatriot Cristiano Ronaldo: indeed, while at Virtus Entella, Mota has been nicknamed "the CR7 of Chiavari". Mota also follows the NBA, and is a fan of LeBron James.

Career statistics

Club

International

Honours 
Virtus Entella
 Serie C Group A: 2018–19

Monza
 Serie C Group A: 2019–20

Portugal U21
 UEFA European Under-21 Championship runner-up: 2021
Individual

 UEFA European Under-21 Championship Squad of the Tournament: 2021
UEFA European Under-21 Championship Goal of the Tournament: 2021

References

External links

 Profile at A.C. Monza 
 
 
 

1998 births
Living people
People from Differdange
Luxembourgian people of Portuguese descent
Luxembourgian footballers
Portuguese footballers
Association football forwards
CS Pétange players
Virtus Entella players
Juventus F.C. players
Juventus Next Gen players
A.C. Monza players
Luxembourg Division of Honour players
Serie B players
Serie C players
Serie A players
Portugal youth international footballers
Portuguese expatriate footballers
Portuguese expatriate sportspeople in Italy
Luxembourgian expatriate footballers
Luxembourgian expatriate sportspeople in Italy
Expatriate footballers in Italy